Gongji may refer to:

Duan Zhixing (died 1200?) or Emperor Gongji of Dali
Gongji, Anhui, town in Taihe County, Anhui, China
Gongji Township in Huadian, Jilin, China
Gongji Subdistrict, in Wafangdian, Liaoning, China